Karol Grossmann (27 October 1864 – 3 August 1929) was a pioneering film maker in the Austro-Hungarian Empire.

He was born in Drakovci near Mala Nedelja on 27 October 1864. He was a lawyer in Ljutomer. He was the first Slovene amateur filmmaker. In 1905, he made the first Slovene film record in Ljutomer in northeastern Slovenia. A projection of two of his films is available at the Museum in Ljutomer. He died in Ljutomer.

Filmography

 Dismissal from Mass in Ljutomer (Odhod od maše v Ljutomeru) - 1905
 Fair in Ljutomer (Sejem v Ljutomeru) - 1905
 In the Family Garden (Na domačem vrtu) - 1906

External links

References 
 Slovenski veliki leksikon, Mladinska knjiga (2003)

1864 births
1929 deaths
People from Ljutomer
Slovenian cinematographers
Slovenian film directors
Slovenian film editors
Slovenian film producers
Austro-Hungarian lawyers
Slovenian screenwriters
Male screenwriters
Cinema pioneers
Slovene Austro-Hungarians
People from the Municipality of Ljutomer
20th-century screenwriters